Beyg Bolaghi (also Romanized as Beyg Bolāghī) is a village in Owch Tappeh-ye Sharqi Rural District, in the Central District of Meyaneh County, East Azerbaijan Province, Iran. At the 2006 census, its population was 141, in 29 families.

References 

Populated places in Meyaneh County